Brisbane School of Theology  is a Bible college in Toowong, Brisbane, Queensland, Australia.

BST is a Bible-centred, interdenominational and formational training college. It welcomes residential, non-residential, full-time and part-time students. The college operates on the Toowong Campus, and is situated in the foothills of Mount Coot-tha, close to the Brisbane CBD.

The college is an affiliated college of the Australian College of Theology (ACT). It offers degrees and diplomas accredited by the Australian College of Theology. It is also linked with other significant educational bodies in the interest of maintaining high academic standards.

The curriculum is designed to achieve the outcomes described in the College's Graduate Attributes. It provides a holistic and integrated program of theological education, encompassing the development of the heart (i.e. formation of Christian character for ministry), the head (i.e. acquiring knowledge for ministry), and the hand (i.e. gaining practical skills for ministry). The college's program especially emphasises biblical studies and mission. Other important components of the curriculum are spiritual formation and field education.

History 
BST has a history that dates back to 1943.  The college was known previously by other names that include Crossway College, Bible College of Queensland (BCQ), and Queensland Bible Institute (QBI).

The Toowong campus was established by the QBI Council in 1947 at Silky Oaks, an historic property situated at Cross Street, Toowong. The home was built by Mr J. S. Thomas and owned for many years by Sir Alfred Cowley (cane farmer, industrialist and parliamentarian), who sold it to L.K. Addison in 1940. 

The property became the Silky Oaks Children's Haven in 1940 before they relocated this facility to Manly. The QBI Council rented the property from Mr Addison.  The college was able to accommodate 30-40 students at the new site.

Principals
College principals include:
Rev Dr Gwilym J. Morgans (1943-1944)
Rev J. Egerton Jacob (1944-1948)
Rev Eric E. Potter (1948-1949, 1950-1956)
Rev John H. Watson (1949)
Rev C. Harold Nicholls (1957-1969)
Rev Geoffrey J. Paxton (1971-1976)
Rev Keith V. Warren (1976-1977)
Dr Ken J. Newton (1977-2002)
Dr Peter Ralphs (2002-2008)
Dr J. Ferreira (2009-2013)
Rev Dr Richard Gibson (2014-current)

References

External links
BST Website

Education in Queensland
Bible colleges
Australian College of Theology
Educational institutions established in 1943
1943 establishments in Australia